Shanghai Science & Technology College(上海科技高等专科学校) was once Shanghai No. 2 Science & Technology School. It was established in 1959 and the school became a college in 1981.

In 1994, the college was merged into the consolidated Shanghai University (上海大学).

References 

Defunct universities and colleges in Shanghai
1959 establishments in China
Educational institutions established in 1959
1994 disestablishments in China
Educational institutions disestablished in 1994